Gaspard D'Alexis (born January 6, 1960) is a former soccer player who played for the Montreal Supra. Born in Haiti, he played for the Canada U20s.

University
D'Alexis played soccer at the Plymouth State College, earning All-America honours in 1983.

International career
D'Alexis played for the Canada men's national under-20 soccer team, making one appearance at the 1979 FIFA World Youth Championship.

Coaching career
Following the end of his playing career, D'Alexis went on to forge a career in soccer coaching. He served as manager of Laval Dynamites until 2001, when he was replaced by Emmanuel Macagno.

In 2010, he was named head coach of the Haiti women's national football team. Despite his resignation in September of the same year, he appears to have returned to coach the team on at least one occasion.

He has also managed local women's and girl's teams in Canada.

Career statistics

Club

Notes

References

1960 births
Living people
Sportspeople from Port-au-Prince
Plymouth State University alumni
Canadian soccer players
Canada men's youth international soccer players
Canadian soccer coaches
Haitian footballers
Haitian football managers
Haitian emigrants to Canada
Canadian people of Haitian descent
Association football defenders
Canadian Soccer League (1987–1992) players
Montreal Supra players